Tunde Oladimeji is a Nigerian documentary filmmaker, actor, director and  television presenter, known for pioneering documentary film in indigenous language in Nigeria.  
He is the director of Aajiirebi, a breakfast show airing on Africa magic Yoruba.

Life
Oladimeji was born in Iseyin, Oyo State,  Nigeria. His mother was a teacher and his father is a surveyor.
He began his filmmaking career at the University of Ibadan where he graduated and co-produced his first film, an adaptation of the late Oladejo Okediji's 1972 book titled Agbalagba akan'''.

He played a major role in Borokini, a Yoruba Telenovela and a lead role in  Akekaka, a film produced by Jaiye Kuti featuring Femi Adebayo, Mercy Aigbe and Ebun Oloyede.

He was also the assistant producer of Amstel Malta Box Office Season 5 and the director of Aajiirebi. He anchored Arambara and co-directed Eleyinju aani, Arambara.

Oladimeji is the producer of Yoruba Heritage Documentary series. One of the documentary series, Ibadan'' was nominated in the best documentary category at the 2020 Africa Magic Viewers' Choice Awards. Other documentary in the series includes Eko àkéte, Abeokuta ilẹ̀ Ẹ̀gbá, Ife Ooye, and Oshogbo Oroki.

References

Living people
Nigerian male film actors
Year of birth missing (living people)
University of Ibadan alumni
Nigerian documentary filmmakers
21st-century Nigerian male actors
Nigerian television presenters
Yoruba male actors
Nigerian television personalities
Male actors in Yoruba cinema
Nigerian entertainment industry businesspeople
Yoruba-language film directors
20th-century births